Furnes Church is a parish church of the Church of Norway in Ringsaker Municipality in Innlandet county, Norway. It is located in the village of Furnes. It is the church for the Furnes parish which is part of the Ringsaker prosti (deanery) in the Diocese of Hamar. The white, stone church was built in a cruciform design in 1708 using plans drawn up by the architect Hans Nielsen. The church seats about 390 people.

History
The earliest existing historical records of the church date back to the 1570s, but the church was not built at that time. The first church was a wooden stave church that was likely built during the 14th century. Records show that the old church was repaired a number of times over the centuries.

In 1700, however, the parish decided to replace the church with a new building on a new site. The parish decided to build a stone cruciform building. The mason Hans Nielsen from Christiania was hired to build the new church, using the Oslo Cathedral (built in 1697) as a model. Stone from the Old Hamar Cathedral was used in the construction of this new church. Construction took place from 1702 to 1707 (there was a break of two years during the construction). The new church was consecrated on 12 July 1708 by Bishop Hans Munch. Some furniture was transferred from the old church into the new church. The old church was demolished after the new one was completed.

Originally, the church had a tower over the centre of the nave. In 1811–1812, the tower was rebuilt and made larger. In 1876–1877, the church underwent a large renovation led by the architect Paul Due, which significantly changed the character of the building. The old tower was removed and a new church porch with a large tower was built on the west end of the nave. Inside the church, the flat ceiling was removed and a high, vaulted ceiling was used. There were new benches installed in the nave. The interior was painted with new colors. In 1957–1958, the church interior was renovated again by Finn Krafft and Bjarne Hvoslef. The vaulted ceiling was closed in with a new flat ceiling. The choir was enlarged and the second floor seating galleries were removed.

Media gallery

See also
List of churches in Hamar

References

Churches in Ringsaker
Churches in Innlandet
Cruciform churches in Norway
Stone churches in Norway
18th-century Church of Norway church buildings
Churches completed in 1708
14th-century establishments in Norway